Johann Jacob Bach (or Johann Jakob) (baptised  – 16 April 1722) was a German musician, composer and an older brother of Johann Sebastian Bach.

Bach is thought to have been born in Eisenach. After his studies at the Latin school there, he became oboist in the municipal band. After the death of their father Johann Ambrosius Bach in 1695, Johann Jacob and Johann Sebastian moved in with their older brother Johann Christoph Bach, organist at Ohrdruf. In 1704, he entered the service in the military band of the army of King Charles XII of Sweden. It is thought that Johann Sebastian Bach wrote his Capriccio on the departure of his Beloved Brother BWV 992 on this occasion.

In 1709, he participated in the Battle of Poltava. During his stay in Constantinople, he studied flute under Pierre-Gabriel Buffardin. From 1713 to 1722, he served as flutist in the court of the Stockholm capelle. He died childless in 1722 in Stockholm and is buried there.

Johann Jacob played oboe, flute and possibly violin. He probably composed the Sonata in C minor under the name Signor Bach.

Sources

For other references, see list of references on the Spanish Wikipedia article on :es:Johann Jacob Bach

1682 births
1722 deaths
German male classical composers
German classical composers
German Baroque composers
German classical oboists
Male oboists
German classical flautists
Johann Jacob
German Lutherans
18th-century classical composers
18th-century German composers
18th-century German male musicians